Darren Dawidiuk (born 21 September 1987 in Truro) is a rugby union footballer, currently playing for Premiership Rugby outfit Bristol Bears. He plays as a hooker.

Dawidiuk joined the Cornish Pirates as an Academy player in 2006 having played his youth rugby at Truro RFC, joining the city club at the age of 12, and making progress through the juniors and colts before he made a 1st team debut as a blind-side flanker in a league match against St. Ives.

Dawidiuk became a member of the South West of England Rugby Academy (SWERA) based at Truro, and he also gained selection to the England Colleges team in 2005.

He played for England Colleges again in 2006, and also captained the Truro College team that beat South Gloucestershire and Stroud College in the final of the British Colleges Cup competition played at Castlecroft.

He made four appearances for the Cornish Pirates in his first season, and followed this with 14 in 2007–08 and 27 total appearances in 2008–2009. He also had a loan period at Redruth RFC during which time he appeared in the first team.

Dawidiuk was signed to Gloucester Rugby in the Aviva Premiership, starting from September 2009. After 8 seasons with Gloucester, on 25 July 2017, Dawidiuk left Kingsholm as he signed for rivals London Irish, returned to the Aviva Premiership from the 2017–18 season.

On 10 May 2018, it was announced Dawidiuk had been signed by Coventry, in preparation for their return to the Championship, following promotion from National League 1.

It was announced on 27 February 2019, that Dawidiuk had agreed to join Northampton Saints on loan until the conclusion of the 2018/19 season.

In November 2020 it was announced that he was currently on a short-term trial at Premiership Rugby side Bristol Bears.

References

External links

Gloucester Rugby Profile
Cornish Pirates Profile

1987 births
Living people
Bristol Bears players
British people of Ukrainian descent
Cornish rugby union players
English rugby union players
Gloucester Rugby players
Rugby union hookers
Rugby union players from Truro